Reingold is a name. Notable people with the name include:

Last name 
 Arvin Reingold (1930-2020), American lawyer and politician
 Babs Reingold, American artist
 David Reingold (born 1968), American sociologist
 Edward Reingold (born 1945), computer scientist
 Isaac Reingold (born 1873), pen name of Isaac Tomim, Russian-born American poet, lyricist, and singer
 Jeremy Reingold, South African swimmer and rugby player
 Jonas Reingold (born 1969), Swedish bass guitar player
 Louis Reingold (1874/75-1944), Yiddish playwright and journalist
 Omer Reingold, computer scientist
 Steven Reingold (born 1998), South African-born English former first-class cricketer
 Svetlana Reingold, Israeli museologist and curator

First name 
 Reingold Berzin (born 1888), Latvian teacher, later Latvian Riflemen and Soviet military leader
 Reingold Gliere (born 1875), Ukrainian composer of German and Polish descent

Other uses 
 Nathan Reingold Prize,

See also 
 Rheingold (disambiguation)